Balthasar Siberer (1679–1757) was an Austrian-born German gymnasium teacher, known for having been an early organ instructor of both Johann Ernst Eberlin and Leopold Mozart.

Siberer was born in Schwaz, Tyrol, and at some point moved to Augsburg, Bavaria, where he became a teacher at the Jesuit Gymnasium of St. Salvator. He lectured in grammar and philosophy, but is remembered today for his organ lessons.

References 
 
 

1679 births
1757 deaths
People from Schwaz
18th-century German educators
Austrian schoolteachers
German schoolteachers
German people of Austrian descent
18th-century German musicians
18th-century male musicians
18th-century German writers
18th-century German male writers